Piscani may refer to several villages in Romania:

 Piscani, a village in Dârmănești Commune, Argeș County
 Piscani, a village in Brădeşti Commune, Dolj County
 Piscani, a village in the town of Scorniceşti, Olt County